María Blanca Estela Pavón Vasconcelos  (February 21, 1926 – September 26, 1949) was a Mexican film actress and singer of the Golden Age of Mexican cinema.

She appeared in several classic films of the 1940s. Her career peaked between 1948 and 1949. 

She won an Ariel Award for Best Actress in the 1947 film Cuando lloran los valientes and was nominated for another due to her successful performances in Mexican films.

She starred alongside Mexican star Pedro Infante in several films including Nosotros los Pobres in 1948.

On September 26, 1949, she died in a plane crash near the Popocatépetl volcano located between Mexico City and Puebla.

Filmography 

 La Liga de las Canciones (1941)
 El Niño de las Monjas (1944)
 Cuando lloran los Valientes (1947)
 Vuelven los Garcìa (1947)
 Los Tres Huastecos (1948)
 La bien pagada (1948)
 Nosotros los Pobres (1948)
 Cortesana (1948)
 The Well-paid (1948)
 En los Altos de Jalisco (1948)
 Ustedes los Ricos (1948)
 En cada puerto un amor (1949)
 Las puertas del presidio (1949)
 La Mujer que yo Perdi (1949)
 Ladronzuela (1949)

Ariel Awards

References

External links 

 

Mexican film actresses
1926 births
1949 deaths
Ariel Award winners
Victims of aviation accidents or incidents in Mexico
Actresses from Veracruz
20th-century Mexican actresses
People from Minatitlán, Veracruz